Two torpedo boats of the Imperial German Navy, both built by Schichau-Werke at their Elbing shipyard have been named SMS S31:

 , launched in 1886, was a small . She was renamed  in 1910 and was sold for scrap in 1920.
 , launched in 1913, was a V25-class torpedo boat . She was sunk on 19 October 1915 after being mined during the Battle of the Gulf of Riga.

References